Man Under Suspicion is a 1984 West German film directed by Norbert Kückelmann.

Cast
 Maximilian Schell as Lawyer Landau
 Lena Stolze as Jessica Kranz
 Robert Aldini as Werner Kranz
 Wolfgang Kieling as Reporter 'Watergate'
 Kathrin Ackermann as Judge
 Manfred Rendl as Public Prosecutor
 Reinhard Hauff as Holm
 Jörg Hube as Commissioner Sommer
 Klaus Höhne as Presiding Magistrate
 Robert Atzorn as Attorney-General
 Patricia Kückelmann as Kathrin Landau
 Markus Urchs as Dropout
 Despina Avramidou as Greek Woman
 Elisabeth Bertram as Grandmother
 Florian Furtwängler as Zurek

Awards and nominations
The film was chosen as West Germany's official submission to the 57th Academy Awards for Best Foreign Language Film, but did not manage to receive a nomination. It was also entered into the 34th Berlin International Film Festival, where it won the Silver Bear.

References

External links

1984 films
1980s crime thriller films
German crime thriller films
West German films
1980s German-language films
Films directed by Norbert Kückelmann
1980s legal films
German political thriller films
Films about terrorism in Europe
1980s political films
Films set in West Germany
1980s German films